The Ice Cream Girls is a three-part British television crime drama, first broadcast in 2013, based on the bestselling novel by Dorothy Koomson. The story follows two vulnerable teenage girls, Serena Gorringe (Lorraine Burroughs) and Poppy Carlisle (Jodhi May), who in the summer of 1995, are accused of murdering their schoolteacher, Marcus Hansley (Martin Compston) after becoming involved in a tryst of violence and sexual abuse. Although Serena is acquitted, Poppy is convicted of murder. In the following years, the two girls lead very different lives - Poppy's family rebuff her, leaving her to serve her prison sentence alone. Serena, however, finds love with university sweetheart Evan (Nicholas Pinnock) and has a daughter, Verity (Dominique Jackson).

But seventeen years later, Poppy and Serena are unexpectedly reunited, and they are forced to confront each other and reveal the truth behind their dark, shared history. The series, broadcast on ITV, was shot in Bray, County Wicklow, which is used to represent the town of Brighton. The series achieved good viewing figures, with the first episode gathering 5.53 million, 4.83 million tuning in for the second episode and 5.18 million for the final episode. Notably, the series has never been released on DVD.

Critical reception
Sam Wollaston of The Guardian said of the first episode, "it shares this with The Poison Tree, too, there's an obviousness to it. An ITV drama-ness about it. It's so consciously trying to be a psychological thriller, not just your bog-standard thriller," and "I'll watch the rest, because it's enthralling enough for me to want to know what happens, or rather what happened. But I won't be lying awake at night thinking about it."

Cast
 Lorraine Burroughs — Serena Farley (née Gorringe)
 Jodhi May — Poppy Carlisle 
 Martin Compston — Marcus Hansley
 Nicholas Pinnock — Evan Farley
 Georgina Campbell — Young Serena Gorringe
 Holli Dempsey — Young Poppy Carlisle
 Dominique Jackson — Verity "Vee" Farley
 Bryan Dick — Al Francis
 Kathy Kiera Clarke — Marlene Riley
 Doña Croll — Rachel Gorringe
 Sara Powell — Fez Gorringe
 Eleanor Methven — Liz Carlisle
 Owen Roe — Jim
 Michael McElhatton — Brian   
 Laura Jane Laughlin — Serena's Lawyer  
 Dylan Tighe — Poppy's Lawyer

Episodes

References

External links

2013 British television series debuts
2013 British television series endings
2010s British drama television series
2010s British television miniseries
English-language television shows
ITV television dramas
Television series by Left Bank Pictures
Television series set in 1995
Television series set in 2013
Television shows set in Brighton
2010s British crime television series